Reset may refer to:

Music

Albums
 Reset (Tina Arena album), 2013 
 Reset (Atari Teenage Riot album), 2014
 Reset (Flying Lotus EP), 2007
 Reset (Funky album), 2011
 Reset (Mutemath EP), 2006
 Reset (Set Your Goals EP), 2006
 Reset (Moneybagg Yo album), 2018
 Peace Orchestra: Reset, by the Peace Orchestra

Other uses in music
 Reset (Canadian band), a French-Canadian punk band
 Reset (Norwegian group), a Norwegian Eurodance group
 "Reset" (song), a song by Outkast from their 2003 album Speakerboxxx/The Love Below
 Reset Records, a British record company

Other uses
 Reset (computing), to bring a system to normal condition or initial state
 Reset (finance), the determination and recording of a reference rate
 Reset (horse), an Australian racehorse
 Reset (law), in Scotland the crime of possessing stolen goods
 Reset (military), equipment refurbishment process
 Reset (film), a 2017 Chinese film
 "Reset" (Arrow), the sixth episode of the eighth season of Arrow
 "Reset" (Torchwood), the sixth episode of the second series of science-fiction series Torchwood
 Reset, 2017 book by Ellen Pao
 Ramsey RESET test, in statistics a general specification test for the linear regression model
 Russian reset, an attempt by the Obama administration to improve relations between the United States and Russia in 2009
 Resetting (typesetting), the act of renewing the typeset of a publication, often in the process of preparing a digital republication of a traditionally set work
 Reset (South Korean TV series), a 2014 South Korean television series
 Reset (Chinese TV series), a 2022 Chinese time-travel/whodunit streaming television series

See also
 Reboot (disambiguation)
 Restart (disambiguation)
 
 Set (disambiguation)
 Digital reset (disambiguation)